A list of notable films produced in the cinema of Spain, ordered by year of release in the 1930s. For an alphabetical list of articles on Spanish films, see :Category:Spanish films.

1930s

See also 

 List of films produced in the Spanish Revolution

External links
 Spanish film at the Internet Movie Database

Lists of 1930s films
1930s
Films